Telšiai County is one of ten counties in Lithuania. It is in the west of the country, and its capital is Telšiai. There are Lithuanians (98.7%), Latvians (0.1%), Russians (0.9%), and others (0.3%). On 1 July 2010, the county administration was abolished, and since that date, Telšiai County remains as the territorial and statistical unit.

Municipalities
Municipalities are:

References

External links
Social and demographic characteristics of Telšiai County
Economy of Telšiai County
Environment of Telšiai County

 
Counties of Lithuania